Pollenia moravica is a species of cluster fly in the family Polleniidae.

Distribution
Austria, Croatia, Czech Republic, Hungary, Poland, Romania, Slovakia, Ukraine, Yugoslavia.

References

Polleniidae
Insects described in 1941
Diptera of Europe